4492 Debussy is a dark and elongated background asteroid and binary system from the intermediate asteroid belt, approximately  in diameter. It was discovered on 17 September 1988, by Belgian astronomer Eric Elst at Haute-Provence Observatory in France. It was later named after French composer Claude Debussy.

Orbit and classification 

Debussy is a non-family asteroid from the main belt's background population. It orbits the Sun in the middle main-belt at a distance of 2.3–3.3 AU once every 4 years and 7 months (1,680 days; semi-major axis of 2.77 AU). Its orbit has an eccentricity of 0.18 and an inclination of 8° with respect to the ecliptic. A first precovery was taken at Palomar Observatory in 1951, extending the body's observation arc by 37 years prior to its official discovery observation.

Naming 

This minor planet was named in memory of French composer Claude Debussy (1862–1918), one of the most prominent figures associated with impressionist music, best known for his Clair de lune and Feux d'artifice, as well as for his piano suites Estampes (1903), Bergamasque (1890–1905) and Images (1905). He was a fervent admirer of Frédéric Chopin, after whom the asteroid  was named. The official naming citation was published on 4 October 1990.

Diameter and albedo 

According to the surveys carried out by the Japanese Akari satellite, the Infrared Spectrograph of the Spitzer Space Telescope, and NASA's Wide-field Infrared Survey Explorer with its subsequent NEOWISE mission, Debussy measures between 13.23 and 17.359 kilometers in diameter and its surface has an albedo between 0.039 and 0.07. The Collaborative Asteroid Lightcurve Link assumes a standard albedo for carbonaceous asteroids of 0.057 and calculates a diameter of 14.64 kilometers with an absolute magnitude of 12.9.

Rotation period 

Between 2002 and 2016, a large number of rotational lightcurve of Debussy were obtained from photometric observations by predominantly Swiss, French and German astronomers. Best rated lightcurve analysis gave a rotation period of 26.606 hours with a brightness variation of 1.04–1.13 magnitude, which indicates that the body is highly elongated.

Satellite 

In November 2002, during the first photometric observations by Swiss astronomer Raoul Behrend at Geneva Observatory in collaboration with several other European astronomers, it was revealed that Debussy is a synchronous binary system with a minor-planet moon in orbit (F-type binary). The satellite's orbital period is 26.606 hours, identical to the primary's rotation. The system's secondary-to-primary mean-diameter ratio is 0.643. The Johnston archive derives a diameter of 9.39 kilometers for the moon, and estimates that it has a semi-major axis of approximately 31 kilometers. After additional follow-up observations had been made, the discovery was announced on 21 March 2004. The collaboration of astronomers from 26 observatories also discovered satellites in orbit of the main-belt asteroids 854 Frostia, 1089 Tama and 1313 Berna.

References

External links 
 Asteroids with Satellites, Robert Johnston, johnstonsarchive.net
 Lightcurve Database Query (LCDB), at www.minorplanet.info
 Dictionary of Minor Planet Names, Google books
 Asteroids and comets rotation curves, CdR – Observatoire de Genève, Raoul Behrend
 Discovery Circumstances: Numbered Minor Planets (1)-(5000) – Minor Planet Center
 
 

004492
Discoveries by Eric Walter Elst
Named minor planets
004492
19880917